Yevgeny Kafelnikov was the defending champion but lost in the final 6–2, 7–6(7–4) against Magnus Gustafsson.

Seeds

Draw

Finals

Top half

Bottom half

External links
 1996 St. Petersburg Open draw

St. Petersburg Open
St. Petersburg Open
1996 in Russian tennis